Sanjay Saraogi  (born in 1969) is a leader of Bharatiya Janata Party and a member of the Bihar Legislative Assembly. 
He was elected to the Assembly for the first time in February 2005 and again in October 2005,
then again in 2010, defeating the nearest RJD candidate by a margin of 26,000 votes from Darbhanga. 
He again defeated Mahagathbandhan candidate and former mayor Om Prakash Kheria by a margin of 7000 votes in the 2015 Bihar assembly election.
In April 2018, he was appointed Chairman of Prakalan Samiti. In the 2020 Bihar Assembly Election, he again defeated RJD candidate Amarnath Gami by the margin of more than 10,000 votes.

References

People from Darbhanga
1969 births
Living people
Bihar MLAs 2015–2020
Bihar MLAs 2010–2015
Bharatiya Janata Party politicians from Bihar
Bihar MLAs 2020–2025